Phillip Shawe (September 1889 – 24 September 1945) was an Australian cricketer. He played two first-class matches for Tasmania between 1913 and 1915.

See also
 List of Tasmanian representative cricketers

References

External links
 

1889 births
1945 deaths
Australian cricketers
Tasmania cricketers
Cricketers from Bangalore